is a Japanese graphic designer, curator and writer. He is a graduate of Musashino Art University. Hara is employed by Musashino Art University as professor, and taught Communication Design and Design Theory in Science on Design Faculty since April 2003.

Hara is one of the leading designers in Japan and his books Designing Design and White are recognized as essential for anyone studying design theory and aesthetics.

Hara has been the art director of Muji since 2001, and designed the opening and closing ceremony programs of the Nagano Winter Olympic Games 1998.

In 2008, Hara partnered with fashion label Kenzo for the launch of its men's fragrance Kenzo Power. He also designed the official posters for EXPO 2005 Aichi, created the signage system for the Umeda Hospital and the visual identification for the Nagasaki Prefectural Art Museum, worked on new design for the Matsuya department store in Ginza, among many other design projects.

In 2021, Hara partnered with Xiaomi and designed a new logo for the company, which was unveiled on 31 March 2021, replacing the previous one. Hara and his company converted the previous square logo into a squircle. He earned $300,000 from the project.

Exhibitions 
In 2000, he organized the exhibition Re-Design: The Daily Products of the 21st Century.

This exhibition was first held at Takeo Paper Show in Tokyo, and then traveled to the U.K. (Glasgow), Denmark (Copenhagen), Hong Kong, Canada (Toronto), and China (Shanghai, Shenzhen, Beijing).

According to Hara, re-design is "a means by which to correct and renew our feelings about the essence of design, hidden within the fascinating environment of an object that is so overly familiar to us that we can no longer see it".

He invited 32 leading Japanese creators from various fields such as architecture, graphic design, lighting, fashion, photography, to design anew some very mundane commodities, and each participant was in charge of one subject to re-design. Shigeru Ban re-designed toilet paper, Masahiko Sato – exit/entry stamps for passports at international airports, Kengo Kuma – roach trap, Kaoru Mende – matches, Kosuke Tsumura – diapers, Naoto Fukasawa – tea bags.

In 2004, Hara planned and produced an exhibition HAPTIC–Awakening the Senses, which focused on human sensory perception in design. For this exhibition, he invited various creators such as fashion designer Kosuke Tsumura, graphic designer Shin Sobue, product designers Jasper Morrison and Naoto Fukasawa, architects Kengo Kuma and Toyo Ito  "to design an object not based on form or color, but motivated primarily by "haptic" considerations". The term haptic means “relating to or pleasant to the sense of touch."

His other exhibitions include The Architects' Macaroni Exhibition (Tokyo), Tokyo Fiber -- Senseware held in Paris, Milan and Tokyo, Japan Car (Paris and London).

Works 

1998 – Umeda Hospital - VI System, Applications 
2000 – Hakkin - Sake Bottle 
2000 – Matsuya Ginza - VI System, Advertising
2003 – MUJI - Poster, "Horizon"
2011 – Tsutaya Shoten (Bookstore) - VI System, Sign System, Applications & Advertising
2011 – Zhi Art Museum - VI System
2014 – PIERRE HERMÉ PARIS - Product Design
2017 – Graphic, “NOH”
2018 – Poster, "Natsure, Naturally, MUJI."

Books

The Riddle of the Macaroni Hole, 2001 

Asahi Shimbunsha published, as a book, a series of columns that Hara had written for the Nihon Keizai Shimbun [Japan Economic Newspaper] from 2000 to 2001.

Designing Design, 2007 

In Designing Design, Hara explains his theories and philosophical approach to design. Hara writes about the essence of design: "There are an unlimited number of ways of thinking and perceiving. In my understanding, to design is to intentionally apply to ordinary objects, phenomena and communication the essence of these innumerable ways of thinking and perceiving".  "Producing something new from scratch is creative, but making known unknown is also an act of creation. Maybe the latter is more useful in nailing down just what design is".
In this book, Hara also mentioned about his study “Information Architecture”. Hara explained, the formation of impression is through the external stimulation of the senses, recall the past memory in the brain, the past memory is constantly combined with the external information to build the "Information Architecture" (form the new memory). By changing the external stimuli, designers can meet the effect of certain information transmission.

Dialogue in Design: Kenya Hara & Masayo Ave, 2007

White, 2010 

He also authored another book, White, which explores white as a design concept. He points out that "white is a color from which color has escaped, but its diversity is boundless." In this book, Kenya Hara elaborates on the importance of "emptiness" in both the visual and philosophical traditions of Japan, and its application to design. Hara writes: "In some cases, white denotes "emptiness." White as noncolor transforms into a symbol of nonbeing. Yet emptiness doesn't mean "nothingness" or "energy-less"; rather, in many cases, it indicates a condition, or kizen, which will likely be filled with content in the future. On the basis of this assumption, the application of white is able to create a forceful energy for communication."

Awakening for Design, 2014

Ex-formation, 2017 
The book introduces a communication design method that is based on the new concept of determining how to make people aware of what they do not know.

Designing Japan : a future built on aesthetics, 2018 

In 2018, the English edition of Nihon no dezain: Biishiki ga tsukuru mirai was released as Designing Japan: A Future Built on Aesthetics. In this work, Hara explains his vision of how his industry can support Japan in crafting a future founded on a unique philosophy of beauty as well as crowd-sourced wisdom from around the world. The book is a foundation for understanding the essence of Japanese aesthetics, while maintaining a practical approach to Japan's circumstances and future possibilities.

100 Whites, 2019 

100 Whites is the extension of his previously published book 'White'. In this book, Hara gives 100 specific examples of white to explain the importance in design. On the basis of these examples he discusses the importance of white in design - not only as a color but as a philosophy. Hara describes how he experiments with the different whites he mentions, what they mean in the process of his work, and how they influence design today.

Awards 
Kenya Hara is the recipient of numerous awards:

2003: Tokyo Art Director's Club Award, Grand Prize for Muji's advertisement campaign "Horizon."

2001: The Mainichi Design Award 2000

1999: The Prime Minister's Award: Japan Calendar Exhibition, EXPO 2005 Calendar

1998: Signage Design Award, Grand Prize, Japan for Umeda Hospital Signage System.

References

External links
 Profile at the Hara Design Institute at the Nippon Design Center
 White, Lars Müller Publishers, 2010
 Designing Japan, Japan Publishing Industry Foundation for Culture, 2018

Japanese industrial designers
1958 births
Living people
Japanese graphic designers
Musashino Art University alumni
Academic staff of Musashino Art University